Borehole UC 65 is a provincial heritage site near Evander in the Mpumalanga province of South Africa.

In 1985 it was described in the Government Gazette as
	

The heritage site is situated on portion 107 of the farm Winkelhaak 135, IS.

Union Corporation
Borehole UC 65 was a prospecting site controlled by the Union Corporation mining company, founded in 1897. Union Corporation had sole control over the 1951 discovery of the Evander gold field, and established four mines there: Bracken, Kinross, Leslie and Winkelhaak.

References

Mining in South Africa
Economy of Mpumalanga
Boreholes